Meslin is a former commune in the Côtes-d'Armor department of Brittany in northwestern France. On 1 January 2016, it was merged into the commune Lamballe, which was merged into the new commune Lamballe-Armor on 1 January 2019.

Population

Inhabitants of Meslin are called meslinois in French.

See also
Communes of the Côtes-d'Armor department

References

External links

Former communes of Côtes-d'Armor